The Alabama–Mississippi State football rivalry, also known as the 90 Mile Drive or the Battle for Highway 82, is an American college football rivalry between the Alabama Crimson Tide football team of the University of Alabama and Mississippi State Bulldogs football team of Mississippi State University. Both universities are founding members of the Southeastern Conference (SEC), and are currently members of the SEC's Western Division. The two campuses are located approximately 90 miles apart and are the two geographically closest SEC universities.

In 1935, MSU Coach Major Ralph Sasse, on "orders" from his team, went to Memphis, Tennessee, to select the first bulldog mascot. Ptolemy, a gift of the Edgar Webster family, was chosen and the Bulldogs promptly defeated Alabama 20–7.

Alabama–Mississippi State is one of the Southeastern Conference's longest-running series, dating back to 1896.  Mississippi State is Alabama's most played opponent, while Alabama is MSU's third most played team behind Ole Miss and LSU. Aside from the Alabama–Ole Miss football rivalry, it also has been one of the league's most lopsided with Alabama leading the series 85–18–3 through the 2022 season.

Notable games
1940: #11 Mississippi State, 8–0–1 on the season, defeated the 7–1 #17 Crimson Tide 13–0 in Tuscaloosa. The Bulldogs forced 5 turnovers on downs and remained undefeated on the season.
1941: The Maroons defeated Alabama in Tuscaloosa in September 14–0 on their way to winning the school's only football SEC Championship. Despite Mississippi State's head-to-head win and conference title, and the fact that Alabama finished #20 in the final AP Poll, Alabama claims a national championship for this season. This has led to many Mississippi State fans and bloggers to clamor for the Bulldogs, who finished 16th in the final poll, to claim the title as well.
1956: The Crimson Tide snapped a 20-game winless streak by defeating the Maroons 13–12 in Tuscaloosa.
1974: 7–0 Alabama, ranked #4 at the time and the eventual SEC Champion, defeated 6–1 and #17 Mississippi State in a 35–0 rout in Tuscaloosa.
1976: The 6–1 Bulldogs, ranked #18, traveled to Tuscaloosa to face the 5–2 and #17 Crimson Tide, where Alabama won 34–17. Had the Bulldogs won, they would have later had to forfeit anyway.
1980: In what is often named the biggest win in Mississippi State football history, the Bulldogs upset the #1 and two-time defending national champion Crimson Tide 6–3 in Jackson, snapping Alabama's 28-game winning streak. The Bulldogs held the prolific Tide wishbone offense to 116 yards on the ground, one third of its season average up to that point. Trailing 6–3 in the final minute, Alabama drove to the MSU 4-yard-line before a big hit from Bulldog linebacker Tyrone Keys jarred the football loose, sealing the upset win for the Bulldogs. After the game, Alabama coach Bear Bryant visited the Mississippi State locker room to congratulate the team for the win. In 2007, College Football News' Pete Futiak named the game the 91st best ending in college football history since 1970.
1981: #8 Alabama avenged its loss from the previous year by defeating the #7 Bulldogs 13–10 in Tuscaloosa in the only top-10 matchup between the two teams until 2014.
1986: #8 Alabama, coming off a loss to Penn State the week before, traveled to Starkville to take on the #19 Bulldogs. The Tide won a dominating 38–3 victory, outgaining the Bulldogs by nearly 400 yards. Bobby Humphrey rushed for a then-school-record 284 yards.
1996: Alabama, 8–1 and ranked #10, fell to the 3–5 Bulldogs 17–16 in Starkville, giving Mississippi State head coach Jackie Sherrill his first win over his alma mater Alabama. Alabama, who missed an extra point earlier in the game, drove to the Mississippi State 39-yard line in the final minute but turned the ball over on downs. Alabama went on to win the SEC West anyway.
1999: The Bulldogs, 8–0 and ranked #8, traveled to Tuscaloosa to take on the 7–2 #11 Crimson Tide, looking for their fourth straight win in the series. However, Alabama defeated MSU 19–7, aided by three turnovers, a blocked punt, and what Mississippi State fans considered to be a pair of "questionable" holding penalties. The win clinched the SEC West for the Crimson Tide and ended the Bulldogs' bid for their second undefeated season.
2006: Mississippi State traveled to Tuscaloosa looking for its first SEC win of the season, while Alabama came in at 6–3. The game featured a pick-6 by each defense, and the Bulldogs stuffed Tide quarterback John Parker Wilson just outside the goal line to end the first half. Anthony Dixon ran for 121 yards, and the Bulldog defense held the Tide out of the end zone in the second half to seal the upset win.
2007: The Bulldogs clinched their first bowl bid in 7 years by beating #21 Alabama 17–12. The Bulldog defense held the Tide out of the end zone the entire game, and cornerback Anthony Johnson returned John Parker Wilson's intercepted pass for 100 yards and a touchdown with 4 seconds to go in the first half.
2012: The Bulldogs traveled to Tuscaloosa with a #13 ranking and a 7–0 record, hoping to knock off defending national champion and #1-ranked Alabama. In the buildup to the game, Mississippi State fans used Twitter to display "#WeBelieve 8–0" messages from all over the world, even including the Bear Bryant statue outside Bryant–Denny Stadium, and many bloggers declared it to be the biggest game in Mississippi State's history. However, the game did not live up to the hype—Alabama won handily, 38–7, holding the Bulldogs to only 47 rushing yards.
2014: The Bulldogs, undefeated and ranked #1 for the first time in school history, traveled to Tuscaloosa to face the 8–1  #5 Crimson Tide. Mississippi State had earned the #1 spot in all polls including the new College Football Playoff Rankings after defeating three top–10 teams in a row (#8 LSU, #6 Texas A&M, and #2 Auburn). The 99th game of the series between the two schools was considered by many to be the biggest game of the rivalry.  After getting their opening points by tackling running back Josh Robinson in the Bulldogs' own endzone for a safety, Alabama went on to defeat the Bulldogs 25–20.  Mississippi State quarterback Dak Prescott, who had been considered a Heisman Trophy frontrunner for much of the 2014 season, became the conference leader in interceptions after throwing three picks during this game.
2017: The 16th ranked Bulldogs took on #2 Alabama on a crazy night where two of the top three teams in the CFP Rankings lost (#1 Georgia and #3 Notre Dame). Alabama ended up rallying from a fourth quarter deficit due to a Jalen Hurts 26-yard TD pass to DeVonta Smith with 25 seconds remaining and the Tide survived in a 31–24 thriller.

Game results

See also 
 List of NCAA college football rivalry games
 List of most-played college football series in NCAA Division I

Notes

References

College football rivalries in the United States
Alabama Crimson Tide football
Mississippi State Bulldogs football